Attica , formerly Remainder of Attica (Υπόλοιπο Αττικής), was an electoral district in the Attica region represented in the Hellenic Parliament. It consisted of East Attica and West Attica and covered all of Attica except for the urban area of Athens (Greater Athens and Greater Piraeus), which were covered by the constituencies of Athens A, Athens B, Piraeus A and Piraeus B. It elected fifteen Members of Parliament (MPs). It was abolished in December 2018 and replaced by East Attica and West Attica.

Elections Results

Legislative election

Members of Parliament

Current members

The following fifteen MPs have been elected in the Greek legislative election, September 2015:

Members (January 2015 – August 2015)
In the Greek legislative election, January 2015, the following fifteen MPs had been elected:

Nasos Athanasiou (Syriza)
Ioannis Dedes (Syriza)
Alexios Mitropoulos (Syriza)
Giorgos Pantzas (Syriza)
Panagiotis Skouroliakos (Syriza)
Eleni Sotiriou (Syriza)
Athanasios Bouras (New Democracy)
Georgia Martinou (New Democracy)
Georgios Vlachos (New Democracy)
Makis Voridis (New Democracy)
Ilias Kasidiaris (Golden Dawn)
George Mavrotas (The River)
Ioannis Gkiokas (KKE)
Pavlos Chaikalis (Independent Greeks)
Evi Christofilopoulou (PASOK)

References

External links
   Results and Elected MPs for the September 2015 Election in Attica constituency (on the website of the Hellenic Ministry of Interior)

Parliamentary constituencies of Greece
Attica